Marian Marzyński (born Marian Kuszner; 12 April 1937) is a Polish American documentary filmmaker.

Career
Marzyński, a child survivor of the Holocaust, has spent more than 40 years working in the media. He began in his native country of Poland as a journalist and television show host, developing such programs such as Tournament of Towns. In 1969 he moved to Denmark, and subsequently to the United States after being offered a teaching job in the newly formed film department of the Rhode Island School of Design (RISD). 

Marzyński has worked alongside fellow Jewish Polish director Roman Polanski as well as taught young American filmmakers such as Gus Van Sant and Jean de Segonzac at RISD. His documentaries for the television program FRONTLINE include Never Forget to Lie (2013), A Jew Among the Germans (2005), Shtetl (1996), After Gorbachev's USSR (1992), Betting on the Lottery (1990), My Retirement Dreams (1988), and Welcome to America (1984).

Marzyński was selected as a Guggenheim fellow in 1982, and won an Emmy Award for his documentary work in both 1986 and 1990.

Personal
Marzyński married Grazyna, an architect. They have 2 children, Bartosz and Anya.

Awards
Marzyński has won the following awards:
'97 Silver Baton for Excellence in Radio/Television Journalism, duPont- Columbia University (Shtetl)
'96 First Prize, Jerusalem International Film Festival (Shtetl)
'96 Grand Prix at the Cinema Du Reel - Paris, France (Shtetl)
'92 George Polk Award in broadcasting journalism (Inside Gorbachev's USSR)
'91 Alfred I. duPont-Columbia Golden Baton for excellence in broadcasting journalism (Inside Gorbachev's USSR)
'91 Retirement Research Foundation Media Award (God Bless America and Poland, Too)
'90 Emmy Award for producing a Documentary (Messenger to Poland)
'86 Emmy Award for writing in Documentary (Out of the Shadows)
'82 Guggenheim Fellowship in Documentary Filmmaking
'67 Silver Dragon (To Be)
'66 Bronze Hobby-Horse of Cracow (Before the Tournament)
'66 Silver Dragon (Before the Tournament)
'64 Golden Dragon (Return of the Ship) 
'64 Golden Hobby-Horse of Cracow (Return of the Ship)

Filmography
Marzyński has directed the following films:
 Do You Speak Chopin? (2016)
 Never Forget to Lie / Frontline (2013)
 Jewish Blues (2011)
 A Jew Among the Germans / Frontline (2005)
 Anya (In and Out of Focus) (2004) 
 Ja, Gombro (2004)
 Patriots Day / American Experience (2004)
 Pol Pot's Shadow / Frontline (2002)
 The Killer's Trail: The Story of Dr. Sam Sheppard / Nova (1999)
 My Retirement Dreams / Frontline (1998)
 Shtetl / Frontline  (1996)
 Mysterious Crash of Flight 201 / Nova (1993)
 Fra Hofteatret: Sorte øjne (1974) 
 Day X (1967) 
 To Be (1967)
 Parent-Teacher Conference (1967)
 Before the Tournament (1966)
 We Apologize for All Inconveniences (1966)
 The Auction (1965)
 Farewell to Fatherland (1964)
 Return of the Ship (1964)

References

External links
lifeonmarz, official Website

 Frontline:  Interview with Marian Marzynski (2005)
 Frontline:  Marian Marzynski: Returning to My Warsaw Story (2013)

1937 births
Living people
Place of birth missing (living people)
American documentary filmmakers
Polish emigrants to the United States
Polish journalists
20th-century Polish Jews